The Canton of Saint-Nom-la-Bretèche is a French former canton, located in the arrondissement of Saint-Germain-en-Laye, in the Yvelines département (Île-de-France région). It had 36,148 inhabitants (2012). It was disbanded following the French canton reorganisation which came into effect in March 2015.

Municipalities
The canton included the following 8 communes:
Saint-Nom-la-Bretèche (seat)
 Bailly
 Chavenay
 L'Étang-la-Ville
 Feucherolles
 Noisy-le-Roi
 Rennemoulin
 Villepreux

See also
Cantons of the Yvelines department
Arrondissements of the Yvelines department

References

Former cantons of Yvelines
2015 disestablishments in France
States and territories disestablished in 2015